Red Sky at Morning: America and the Crisis of the Global Environment by James Gustave Speth, is a 2004 Yale University Press book whose central premise is that environmentalism, so far, has been unsuccessful in protecting the natural environment on Earth. Deprecating the past efficacy of the Natural Resources Defense Council, the White House Council on Environmental Quality, and the United Nations Development Programme — as well as the actions of the former George W. Bush administration – Speth writes (as cited in the TIME article listed in the "References" section): "The climate convention is not protecting climate, the biodiversity convention is not protecting biodiversity, [and] the desertification convention is not preventing desertification."

Potential for effective environmentalism, he says (as cited in the TIME article) now rests upon actions analogous to "jazz": volunteerism, and improvisation. He also notes, "Since the Montreal Protocol, [the United States] has not accorded global-scale environmental challenges the priority needed." (p.116)

References
Red Sky at Morning: America and the Crisis of the Global Environment. A Citizen's Agenda for Action, James Gustave Speth. New Haven and London: Yale University Press, 2004, 

 "Books: Storm Warnings Ahead." Linden, Eugene (2004, April 5). TIME, Vol. 163 (No. 14). pg. 79. Retrieved from: http://content.time.com/time/magazine/article/0,9171,993757,00.html

External links
Review by Hinkle Charitable Foundation

2004 in the environment
Environmental non-fiction books